Lake River is a tributary, about  long, of the Columbia River in the U.S. state of Washington. It flows north from Vancouver Lake in Vancouver to meet the larger river near Ridgefield and the northern tip of Bachelor Island. The Wilkes Expedition of 1841 referred to Lake River as Calipaya Inlet.

The river is part of the  Lewis River – Vancouver Lake Water Trail linking Vancouver Lake to Woodland by waters suitable for kayaks and other boats. Portions of the Ridgefield National Wildlife Refuge border the river.

Course
Lake River, a "slow, flat slough of the Columbia River", loses only  in elevation over its entire  course. It flows north, roughly parallel to the Columbia until curving slightly northwest to join it. At times, tidal fluctuations and high flows along the Columbia cause Lake River to flow backwards into the lake, sometimes for long periods.

Flowing out of the lake and Vancouver Lake Park, the river receives Buckmire Slough from the left. Beyond the confluence, Shillapoo Wildlife Area is to the left, and the unincorporated community of Felida is to the right. About  further downstream, Salmon Creek enters from the right.

Over the next , the river passes between Curtis Lake on the right and Round Lake on the left. About  from the mouth, Lake River enters Ridgefield National Wildlife Refuge and passes between Green Lake on the right and Post Office Lake on the left. Whipple Creek enters from the right at RM 7 (RK 11). Over the next , Campbell Lake is on the left.

A mile or so later, Bachelor Island Slough enters from the left, and Carty Lake is on the right as the stream re-enters the wildlife refuge.

Watershed and water quality
The watershed includes the mostly urban  catchment of Burnt Bridge Creek, which empties into Vancouver Lake. Also parts of the watershed are the lake and its surrounds, land along the main stem, and the urban, suburban, rural lands along tributary streams, principally Salmon, Whipple, and Flume creeks. The water quality of all these water bodies is relatively poor.

See also
List of rivers of Washington
List of tributaries of the Columbia River

References

Rivers of Washington (state)
Rivers of Clark County, Washington
Tributaries of the Columbia River